Jiang Weipeng (born 3 January 1993) is a Chinese footballer who plays as a defender for Quanzhou Yassin.

Club career
Jiang Weipeng started his professional football career in 2013 when he was promoted to Chinese Super League side Tianjin Teda. He made his senior debut on 10 July 2013 in a 5–0 away loss against Liaoning Whowin in the 2013 Chinese FA Cup. Jiang was loaned to Tianjin Huaruide in 2014. However, Tianjin Huaruide failed to register for joining the China League Two. He was loaned to China League Two side Jiangxi Liansheng in July 2014. On 2 August 2014, he made his debut for the club in a 1–0 home win against Sichuan Longfor. However, he suffered a severe injury in the training in August 2014, ruling him out for the rest of the season. He played for Tianjin Teda's reserve team in 2015.

Jiang joined to China League Two side Hainan Boying & Seamen in March 2016. He scored his first senior goal on 20 August 2016 in a 1–0 away win against Nantong Zhiyun.

Jiang transferred to Chinese Super League side Yanbian Funde on 19 January 2017. He made his debut for Yanbian on 5 March 2017 in a 0–0 away draw against Chongqing Lifan.

Jiang transferred fellow China League One to Qingdao Huanghai in February 2019.

Career statistics
.

Honours

Club
Qingdao Huanghai
China League One: 2019

References

External links
 

1993 births
Living people
Chinese footballers
Footballers from Jiangsu
People from Lianyungang
Association football defenders
Jiangxi Beidamen F.C. players
Tianjin Jinmen Tiger F.C. players
Yanbian Funde F.C. players
Qingdao F.C. players
Chinese Super League players
China League One players
China League Two players